Aristolochia cucurbitoides is a species of plant in the family Aristolochiaceae. It is endemic to China.

References

Flora of China
cucurbitoides
Vulnerable plants
Taxonomy articles created by Polbot